The Moving Pictures Tour was a concert tour by Canadian rock band Rush in support of their eighth studio album, Moving Pictures.

Background
Prior to the tour stating in February 1981 and preparing to enter the studio to record Moving Pictures, the band performed an isolated number of shows from September 11 to October 1, 1980 with Saxon as a support act. The tour began in Kalamazoo on February 20, 1981 and concluded on July 5 in East Troy. Max Webster, FM, Goddo and The Joe Perry Project were also opening acts for Rush on the tour. The March 27, 1981 performance in Montreal was recorded for the band's live album, Exit... Stage Left and its accompanying video. Each show was estimated to have costed $40,000 which featured back-projected film, pyro and dry ice. 905,000 fans had attended the shows overall on tour, with the band making an estimate of $4 million by the end of the tour.

Reception
John Griffin from the Montreal Gazette who attended the performance in Montreal, noted that Geddy Lee's vocals sounded like a guinea pig with an amphetamine habit, but praised both Lifeson, referring to his guitar playing as ordinary at best, and Peart, acknowledging his drumming as an interesting aspect that he made so little of the massive drum kit.

Don Adair, a reporter from the Spokesman-Review opened his review of the band's show in Spokane, stating that the band gave the nearly full coliseum their money's worth, stating that it was heavy metal all the way complete with flash pot and thunderous decibels. Adair praised the band as a healthy rock and roll band, stating that it wouldn't bait the kids with pandering Van Halenesque sex and booze references, and healthy to do a two hour show with minimum posturing and carry the show with their orchestrated music. He also praised the lighting and effects that contributed to the dynamics of the performance which were designed by Howard Ungerlieder. He however, criticized that the music took it far too seriously, calling it pretentious.

Roman Cooney from the Calgary Herald opened his review of the Edmonton performance, comparing Geddy Lee's vocals to a cat, but continued by stating that the band continued to push the heavy metal tide a little farther from imbecility. He claimed that if the band continued to spoil the heavy metal image and making their concerts more musically arresting than before, the group would be taken more seriously. Cooney commented on Peart's drum solo, noting it as "startlingly innovative". He later commented on the rest of the show with the band switching back and forth between "creative, exciting rock" and "insipid, banal exercises in needless noise and commotion". He concluded his review, stating that the band is becoming more adventurous on stage, being able to recreate the excitement their music had on vinyl.

Setlist
These are example setlists adapted from Rush: Wandering the Face of the Earth – The Official Touring History of what were performed during the tour, but may not represent the majority of the shows.

1980 Setlist
"2112: Overture/Temples of Syrinx"
"Freewill"
"By-Tor and the Snow Dog"
"Xanadu"
"Limelight"
"The Trees"
"Cygnus X-1 Book II: Hemispheres – Prelude"
"The Spirit of Radio"
"Closer to the Heart"
"Beneath, Between and Behind"
"Tom Sawyer"
"Jacob's Ladder"
"A Passage to Bangkok"
"Natural Science"
"Working Man"
"Finding My Way"
"Anthem"
"Bastille Day"
"In the Mood"  (with Neil Peart drum solo) 
Encore
"La Villa Strangiato"

1981 Setlist
"2112: Overture/Temples of Syrinx"
"Freewill"
"Limelight"
"Book II: Hemispheres – Prelude"
"Beneath, Between and Behind"
"The Camera Eye"
"YYZ" (with drum solo)
"Broon's Bane"
"The Trees"
"Xanadu"
"The Spirit of Radio"
"Red Barchetta"
"Closer to the Heart"
"Tom Sawyer"
"Vital Signs"
"Natural Science"
"Working Man"
"Book II: Hemispheres – Armageddon"
"By-Tor and the Snow Dog"
"In the End"
"In the Mood"
"2112: Grand Finale"
Encore
"La Villa Strangiato"

Tour dates

Box office score data

Personnel
 Geddy Lee – vocals, bass, keyboards
 Alex Lifeson – guitar, backing vocals
 Neil Peart – drums

References

Citations

Sources
 
 
 
 

Rush (band) concert tours
1980 concert tours
1981 concert tours
Concert tours of North America
Concert tours of the United States
Concert tours of Canada